Old Battersea House is one of the oldest surviving buildings in Battersea, South West London and is Grade II* listed. It was built around 1699, and was once rumoured to have been designed by Sir Christopher Wren.

Building
Until the 1930s, the building was known as Terrace House. It was built for the "naval administrator" Samuel Pett, and was most likely completed in 1699.

Battersea Council almost demolished the house in the 1920s and built St. John's estate (now Battersea Village) on the grounds of the house in the 1930s. In 1931 it passed into the possession of novelist Wilhelmina Stirling, who renamed it Old Battersea House. Under her tenure the house served to house a collection of art by her sister, the Pre-Raphaelite painter Evelyn De Morgan, and Evelyn's husband, the potter designer William De Morgan. This collection is now kept by the De Morgan Foundation.

The building was listed on 28 June 1954 and became derelict after Stirling's death in 1965. It was acquired by Malcolm Forbes in 1970 and housed some of his family's valuable art collection until 2011.

References

Grade II* listed buildings in the London Borough of Wandsworth
Grade II* listed houses in London
Buildings and structures in Battersea
Houses in the London Borough of Wandsworth